The crimson-breasted finch (Rhodospingus cruentus), also known as the crimson finch-tanager, is a species of small finch-like bird native to woodland and scrub of western Ecuador and adjacent north-western Peru. It is the only member of the genus Rhodospingus. It has traditionally been placed in the family Emberizidae, but molecular phylogenetic studies have shown that it belongs to the tanager family Thraupidae. It is strongly sexually dichromatic, with males being blackish above and rich orange-red below and on the crown, while females are overall dull greyish-buff.

Taxonomy
The crimson-breasted finch  was formally described in 1844 by the French naturalist René Lesson under the binomial name Tiaris cruentus . The type locality is Guayaquil in Ecuador. The crimson-breasted finch is now the only species placed in the genus Rhodospingus that was erected by the English ornithologist Richard Bowdler Sharpe in 1888. The genus name combines the Ancient Greek rhodon meaning "rose" and spingos meaning "finch". The specific epithet cruentus is the Latin word for "bloody". The crimson-breasted finch is monotypic: no subspecies are recognised.

Gallery

References

External links
 Xeno-canto: audio recordings of the crimson-breasted finch

crimson-breasted finch
Birds of Ecuador
Birds of Peru
Birds of the Tumbes-Chocó-Magdalena
crimson-breasted finch
Taxa named by René Lesson